The Gillis-Grier House is a historic home located at Salisbury, Wicomico County, Maryland, United States. It is a -story Queen Anne style frame house built in 1887 by James Cannon. The house has gable-front elevations on three sides, a three-story octagonal tower, and a shorter -story service wing. Also on the property is a frame -story stable, now used as a garage.  It is one of the dwellings that define Salisbury's Newtown neighborhood and named after the two inter-related families that held title to the property between 1896 and 1975.

The Gillis-Grier House was listed on the National Register of Historic Places in 1972.

References

External links
, including photo from 1999, at Maryland Historical Trust

Houses in Wicomico County, Maryland
Houses on the National Register of Historic Places in Maryland
Houses completed in 1887
Queen Anne architecture in Maryland
Buildings and structures in Salisbury, Maryland
National Register of Historic Places in Wicomico County, Maryland